

Overview

District 1

This district encompasses the Idaho Panhandle region and most of the Boise metropolitan area.

In the May 23 primary, conservative state Representative Bill Sali edged out a crowded field to win the Republican nomination with 26%, while Larry Grant won the Democratic nomination. Sali is a controversial figure in Idaho politics who clashed repeatedly with Republican leadership in the Idaho Legislature. Some of Sali's Republican detractors publicly said that they would back Grant in the general election. All this gave Grant a boost in the general election, but Sali remained favored given the GOP tilt of the area and the popular Otter at the top of the ticket. Grant made gains late in the campaign, but Sali held on to win.

Republican primary

Candidates
Bill Sali, Idaho State Representative
Robert Vasquez, Canyon County Commissioner
Sheila Sorensen, Idaho State Senator
Keith Johnson, Idaho State Controller
Norm Semanko, attorney
Skip Brandt, Idaho State Senator

Results

Democratic primary
Larry Grant, attorney
Cecil Kelly III, small business owner

Results

General election

Results

District 2

This district encompasses Eastern Idaho, the Magic Valley, and most of the city of Boise. Republican incumbent Michael Simpson, who has never faced much electoral difficulty, defeated Democratic nominee Jim Hansen in the general election, along with several independent candidates.

Results

References

External links
 Rep. Bill Sali's campaign website
 Grant for Congress campaign website

See also

Idaho
2006
2006 Idaho elections